Slovenia originally planned to participate in the Eurovision Song Contest 2020 with the song "" written by Ana Soklič and Bojan Simončič. The song was performed by Ana Soklič. Slovenian broadcaster  (RTV Slovenija) organised the national final EMA in order to select the Slovenian entry for the 2020 contest in Rotterdam, Netherlands. 18 entries competed in the first stage of the national final, EMA FREŠ 2020, from which two entries qualified to compete in EMA 2020 following a two-month-long competition. Twelve entries competed in EMA 2020 where the winner was selected over two rounds of voting. In the first round, the top two entries were selected by a three-member jury panel. In the second round, "" performed by Ana Soklič was selected as the winner entirely by a public vote.

Slovenia was drawn to compete in the first semi-final of the Eurovision Song Contest which took place on 12 May 2020. However, the contest was cancelled due to the COVID-19 pandemic.

Background 

Slovenia's highest placing in the contest, to this point, has been seventh place, which the nation achieved on two occasions: in 1995 with the song "" performed by Darja Švajger and in 2001 with the song "Energy" performed by Nuša Derenda. The country's only other top ten result was achieved in 1997 when Tanja Ribič performing "" placed tenth. Since the introduction of semi-finals to the format of the contest in 2004, Slovenia had thus far only managed to qualify to the final on six occasions. In 2019, "" performed by Zala Kralj and Gašper Šantl qualified to the final and placed fifteenth.

The Slovenian national broadcaster,  (RTV Slovenija), broadcasts the event within Slovenia and organises the selection process for the nation's entry. RTV Slovenija confirmed Slovenia's participation in the 2020 Eurovision Song Contest on 1 August 2019. The Slovenian entry for the Eurovision Song Contest has traditionally been selected through a national final entitled  (EMA), which has been produced with variable formats. To this point, the broadcaster has only foregone the use of this national final in 2013 when the Slovenian entry was internally selected. For 2020, the broadcaster opted to organise EMA 2020 to select the Slovenian entry and launched the newly-created associated competition  that acted as a preselector for EMA itself.

Before Eurovision

EMA FREŠ 2020 
The final of the competition was broadcast on TV SLO1 and online via the broadcaster's RTV 4D platform.

Format 
Eighteen songs competed over three stages between 4 November 2019 and 18 January 2020. The eighteen songs competed in nine daily duels in the first stage with three duels per week. In each week, online voting held between Monday and Wednesday selected the duel winners to proceed to a weekly final, while the remaining entries proceeded to the second stage. In each weekly final, an expert jury and online voting selecting two of the three songs to proceed to the final. The online vote selected the first finalist and the jury selected the other finalist, while the remaining entry proceeded to the second stage. The second stage was a Second Chance round where the remaining twelve songs competed in six daily duels with three duels per week. The same process of the first stage was applied which resulted in the elimination of eight songs. The third stage was the final, during which a three-member expert jury and public televoting selected two of the ten songs to proceed to EMA 2020. The televote selected the first qualifier and the jury selected the other qualifier.

Competing entries 
Artists and composers were able to submit their entries to the broadcaster between 1 August 2019 and 19 September 2019. All artists were required to be under the age of 26 and have three or less commercially released songs. An expert committee consisting of Maja Pinterič (social media influencer), Rebeka Tomc (social media influencer), Denis Živcec (journalist and Eurovision expert), Klemen Kopina (television presenter) and Bojan Cvjetićanin (singer-songwriter) selected eighteen artists and songs for the competition from the received submissions. The competing artists were announced on 21 October 2019.

Duels
The duels stage of  took place over three weeks between 4 and 22 November 2019, hosted by Bojan Cvjetićanin, who would later go on to represent Slovenia in the Eurovision Song Contest 2023 as lead singer of Joker Out, Klemen Kopina, Denis Živčec, Maja Pinterič and Rebeka Tomc. In each week a daily online vote selected one of the two competing entries in each of the three duels to proceed to the weekly final. The remaining three entries proceeded to the Second Chance round. An additional qualifier was then selected out of the remaining two entries by a jury panel.

Second Chance 
The Second Chance round of  took place over three weeks between 25 November and 6 December 2019, hosted by Bojan Cvjetićanin, Klemen Kopina, Denis Živčec, Maja Pinterič and Rebeka Tomc. In each week a daily online vote selected one of the two competing entries in each of the three duels to proceed directly to the weekly final. The remaining three entries proceeded to the Second Chance round. An additional qualifier was then selected out of the remaining two entries by a jury panel.

Final
The final of  took place on 18 January 2020 at the  Studio 2 in Ljubljana, hosted by Maja Pinterič and Bojan Cvjetićanin. In addition to the performances of the competing entries, Fed Horses, Lumberjack and Raiven performed as guests. Two entries qualified to EMA 2020. The ten competing entries first faced a public vote where the winning song proceeded. An additional qualifier was then selected out of the remaining nine entries by a three-member jury panel. The jury consisted of Urša Mihevc (singer-songwriter and member of Fed Horses), Rok Ahačevčič (singer-songwriter and member of Lumberjack) and Jernej Vene (music editor for Radio Val 202).

EMA 2020 
EMA 2020 was the 24th edition of the Slovenian national final format .

Competing entries
Artists and composers were able to submit their entries to the broadcaster between 1 August 2019 and 19 November 2019. 74 entries were received by the broadcaster during the submission period. An expert committee consisting of Raiven (musician and singer), Mojca Menart (head of the publishing business of ZKP RTV SLO) and Jernej Vene (music editor for Radio Val 202) selected ten artists and songs for the competition from the received submissions. The competing artists were announced on 20 December 2019. Among the competing artists were former Slovenian Eurovision contestant Tinkara Kovač who represented Slovenia in 2014 and former Slovenian Junior Eurovision contestant Lina Kuduzović who represented Slovenia in Junior Eurovision 2015. Božidar Wolfand – Wolf represented Yugoslavia in Eurovision 1984 as a backing vocalist.

Final
EMA 2020 took place on 22 February 2020 at the  Studio 1 in Ljubljana, hosted by Klemen Slakonja. In addition to the performances of the competing entries, 2019 Slovenian Eurovision entrants zalagasper performed as guests. An online backstage broadcast at 's official website also occurred concurrently with the competition, which was hosted by Boštjan Gorenc, Anže Tomić and Eva Košak. The winner was selected over two rounds of voting. In the first round, a three-member jury panel selected two entries to proceed to the second round. The jury consisted of Maja Keuc (singer and 2011 Slovenian Eurovision entrant), Darja Švajger (singer, vocal coach and 1995 and 1999 Slovenian Eurovision entrant) and Nuša Derenda (singer and 2001 Slovenian Eurovision entrant). In the second round, a public vote selected "" performed by Ana Soklič as the winner.

At Eurovision 
According to Eurovision rules, all nations with the exceptions of the host country and the "Big Five" (France, Germany, Italy, Spain and the United Kingdom) are required to qualify from one of two semi-finals in order to compete for the final; the top ten countries from each semi-final progress to the final. The European Broadcasting Union (EBU) split up the competing countries into six different pots based on voting patterns from previous contests, with countries with favourable voting histories put into the same pot. On 28 January 2020, a special allocation draw was held which placed each country into one of the two semi-finals, as well as which half of the show they would perform in. Slovenia was placed into the first semi-final, to be held on 12 May 2020, and was scheduled to perform in the first half of the show. However, due to the COVID-19 pandemic, the contest was cancelled.

Prior to the Eurovision Song Celebration YouTube broadcast in place of the semi-finals, it was revealed that Slovenia was set to perform in position 5, following the entry from North Macedonia and before the entry from Lithuania.

References

2020
Countries in the Eurovision Song Contest 2020
Eurovision